Pedro Mba Obiang Avomo (born 27 March 1992) is a professional footballer who plays as a midfielder for  club Sassuolo and the Equatorial Guinea national team.

Obiang had previously played for Sampdoria, before moving to West Ham United in 2015. Born in Spain, Obiang has represented his native country at under-17, under-19 and under-21 levels, before switching to represent Equatorial Guinea.

Club career

Sampdoria
Born in Alcalá de Henares, in the Community of Madrid, Obiang began his football career playing for various teams from his home city such CD Avance, RSD Alcalá and AD Naya, where he excelled. Due to these participations, he was transferred to the Cadete team of Atlético Madrid. He left Atlético for Sampdoria in 2008 at age 16, the minimum age that international transfer within the European Union is allowed. He was the member of Allievi Nazionali youth team in 2008–09 season, but also call-up to the first team in pre-season. He was also an unused substitute against Lazio and against Chievo, by the decision of head coach Walter Mazzarri. In 2009–10, he was promoted to senior youth team – Primavera.

Primary a youth team player, Obiang also played seven times in pre-season friendlies in summer 2010, scoring two goals. After the injury crisis of the Genoese team in which the team lost midfielders Stefano Guberti, Fernando Tissone, Andrea Poli and Paolo Sammarco, he received a call-up again from new head coach Domenico Di Carlo, and made his competitive debut on 12 September 2010. He substituted Vladimir Koman in the 58th minute, at that time Sampdoria losing 2–1 to Juventus; eventually, Sampdoria 3–3 draw at Stadio Olimpico di Torino. Obiang signed a new, five-year contract extension with Doria on the morning before the start of the match.

Obiang also named in 2010–11 UEFA Champions League 25-men senior squad (list A) for play-off round and received the call-up against Werder Bremen, however Obiang was not named as one of players on the substitutes' bench. He also received his first call-up for 2010–11 UEFA Europa League on 28 September 2010 as list B players (Under-21 youth product). He made his European debut on 16 December 2010 (matchday 6), with the club already eliminated before the match, a 0–2 defeat to Debreceni.

West Ham United
On 10 June 2015, West Ham United announced the signing of Obiang for an undisclosed fee on a four-year contract. He made his Premier League debut on 15 August as a half-time substitute for Reece Oxford in a 1–2 home defeat to Leicester City. In November 2016, Obiang was announced as West Ham's Player of the Month for October.

On 4 February 2017, Obiang scored his first Premier League goal for West Ham on his 55th appearance for the club, against Southampton. The ball fell to Obiang from a corner, where he controlled, and then shot finding the bottom corner from 25 yards out.  On 20 March 2017, he was ruled out for the remainder of the 2016–17 season, having rolled his ankle during a home defeat by Leicester on 18 March 2017.
In January 2018, Obiang was injured during an FA Cup game against Wigan Athletic. In February he underwent knee surgery and was ruled out for the remainder of the 2017–18 season.

Obiang won the 2017–18 West Ham goal of the season award for his thunderbolt strike against Tottenham.

Sassuolo
On 24 July 2019, Obiang signed for Sassuolo.
He was diagnosed with bronchopulmonary disease in August 2021 and was omitted from all sporting activity as a precaution.

International career
Obiang has been capped for Spain at youth levels. Obiang received a call up for Porto International Tournament in April 2011.

Due to his Fang background, the Gabonese Football Federation tried unsuccessfully to persuade Obiang to play for Gabon, although both his parents and his grandparents are from Equatorial Guinea. In November 2011, they included him in a squad list for a match between the country's under-20 and China, however he ignored the call.

Being eligible to represent Equatorial Guinea, in 2011, the country's federation approached Obiang to enquire if he would be willing to represent the country at the 2012 Africa Cup of Nations, however Obiang declined. In April 2015, after a meeting with the Equatoguinean Football Federation people, Obiang's stance on representing Equatorial Guinea appeared to have changed after showing a desire to play for the country. On 5 October 2016, Obiang reunited in London with Equatoguinean Football Federation president Andrés Mbomio, and Equatoguinean national team head coach and coordinator Esteban Becker and Juvenal Edjogo-Owono respectively to reach an agreement.

On 7 November 2018, Obiang was officially called up for the Equatorial Guinea national team. Obiang made his debut for Equatorial Guinea in a 1–0 loss to Senegal on 18 November 2018. In December 2018 he said he was "proud" to play for the nation. He scored his first international goal on 22 March 2019 in a 4–1 African Cup of Nations qualifying win against Sudan.

Career statistics

Club

International

Scores and results list Equatorial Guinea's goal tally first, score column indicates score after each Obiang goal.

References

External links

Sampdoria profile 

1992 births
Living people
People from Alcalá de Henares
Citizens of Equatorial Guinea through descent
Equatoguinean footballers
Equatorial Guinea international footballers
Fang people
Spanish footballers
Spain youth international footballers
Spain under-21 international footballers
Spanish sportspeople of Equatoguinean descent
Association football midfielders
U.C. Sampdoria players
West Ham United F.C. players
U.S. Sassuolo Calcio players
Serie A players
Serie B players
Premier League players
Equatoguinean expatriate footballers
Expatriate footballers in Italy
Equatoguinean expatriate sportspeople in England
Expatriate footballers in England
Spanish expatriate footballers
Spanish expatriate sportspeople in England
Equatoguinean expatriate sportspeople in Italy
Spanish expatriate sportspeople in Italy